Dareh Rash-e Mohammad Soltan (also Romanized as Dāreh Rash-e Moḩammad Solṭān; also known as Dāreh Rash, Dāreh Rashī, Dār-e Rash, Dār Rash, Darreh Rashīd, and Darreh-ye Rashīd) is a village in Qalkhani Rural District, Gahvareh District, Dalahu County, Kermanshah Province, Iran. At the 2006 census, its population was 251, in 49 families.

References 

Populated places in Dalahu County